Madres egoístas is a Mexican telenovela produced by Televisa for Telesistema Mexicano in 1963.

Cast 
Carlos Navarro
Blanca Sánchez
María Idalia
Patricia Morán

References

External links 

Mexican telenovelas
1963 telenovelas
Televisa telenovelas
1963 Mexican television series debuts
1963 Mexican television series endings
Spanish-language telenovelas